Pro Duta Football Club played in Liga Indonesia Premier Division in 2015.   Their homebase is in Teladan, Medan.

Players

2015 First Team Squad

Friendly Matches

International Friendly Matches

2015 Viareggio Cup - Italia

The Torneo di Viareggio, official name Viareggio Cup World Football Tournament Coppa Carnevale, is one of the most important youth football tournaments in the world. It is officially recognized by CONI, FIGC, UEFA and FIFA. It is held each year in Viareggio, Tuscany and its surroundings, starting on the begins the third last Carnival Monday. The tournament runs for a fortnight, and finishes on the last Monday of Carnival. For this reason, it is also known as Coppa Carnevale (Carnival Cup). In 2015 Viareggio Cup Pro Duta FC represented by its U-19 young team. 
In 2015 Viareggio Cup Pro Duta FC joined in Group 5 together with Inter Milan, K.R.C. Genk and Parma F.C.

Local Friendly Matches

Pangdam I/BB Cup 2015

References

Pro Duta seasons
Indonesian football clubs 2015 season